This is a list of notable homicides in California. This list includes notable homicides committed in the U.S. state of California that have a Wikipedia article on the killing, the killer, or the victim. It is divided into four subject areas as follows:
 Multiple homicides – homicides having multiple victims, including incidents involving spree killers, acts of terrorism, two mass homicides involving criminal acts causing airline crashes, and a mass suicide directed by a cult leader. The article includes sub-lists for homicides involving school shootings, familicides, and police shootouts.
 Serial killers – persons who murder three or more persons with the incidents taking place over more than a month and including a significant period of time between them
 Single homicides – notable homicides involving a single fatality, including homicides involving celebrities as victims or perpetrators
 Bias homicides – includes attacks directed against Native Americans (a more complete list of those incidents is set forth in the California genocide article), Asian immigrants, members of a religious group, and individuals based on sexual orientation

Multiple homicides
Listed in chronological order

School shootings
Listed in chronological order

Familicides
Listed in chronological order

Police shootouts and killings
Listed in chronological order

Serial killers
Listed in chronological order by date of earliest homicide

Single homicides
Listed in chronological order

Bias homicides
Listed in chronological order. NOTE: A more complete list of killings of indigenous peoples of California during the California Indian Wars is presented in the article on California genocide.

See also
 California genocide
 List of shootings in California
 List of people executed in California
 List of deaths and violence at the Cecil Hotel

Further reading
 "Forgotten California Murders 1915 to 1918", David Alexander Kulczyk, 2021
 "Murderers In California: The Unforgettable True Stories of Compulsive Serial Killers on the West Coast", Brenda Brown, Ryan Becker, 2020
 "Murder in California: Serial Killers and Unsolved Murders", Marques Vickers, 2019

References

Murder in California
California-related lists